Susan Traylor is an American actress.  She was nominated for the Independent Spirit Award for Best Female Lead for her performance in Valerie Flake (1999). Traylor's starring role in Valerie Flake also won the inaugural best feature award at The Women's Image Network Awards.

Personal life
Traylor was born in New York to William Traylor and Peggy Feury.  She has a sister, Stephanie Feury.

Traylor is married to Jesse Dylan; they have two children.

Filmography

Film

Television

References

External links
 
 

20th-century American actresses
21st-century American actresses
Actresses from New York (state)
American film actresses
American television actresses
Living people
Year of birth missing (living people)